is a correctional facility in Miyakojima-ku, Osaka. A part of the penal system of Japan, it is operated by the Ministry of Justice.

One of Japan's seven execution chambers is in this facility.

Notable prisoners
Kaoru Kobayashi (hanged 21 February 2013)
Mamoru Takuma (hanged 14 September 2004)
Yukio Yamaji (hanged 28 July 2009)
Sokichi Furutani (hanged 31 May 1985)
Yoshihiro Inoue (hanged 6 July 2018)
Yasutoshi Kamata (hanged 25 March 2016)
Tomohiro Katō (hanged 26 July 2022)
Tomomitsu Niimi (hanged 6 July 2018)
Keizo Okamoto (hanged 27 December 2018)
Hiroya Suemori (hanged 27 December 2018)
Kenichi Watanabe (hanged 16 June 1988)
Tetsuya Yamagami (held pending mental evaluation)
Yoshio Yamasaki (hanged 17 June 2008)

References

Buildings and structures in Osaka
Prisons in Japan
Execution sites in Japan